Dalit History Month is an annual observance as a way of remembering important people and events in the history of the Dalits or Scheduled Castes and Scheduled Tribes. It is celebrated in April all over the world by Ambedkarites, followers of Dr. B.R. Ambedkar. Discussions, storytelling, history projects, special publications in media, and art works are organized during this month. The Canadian Province of British Columbia recognized April as Dalit History Month.

History
Inspired by Black History Month, a young group of Dalit women started the Dalit History Month in 2013. Sanghapali Aruna started project Dalit History Month for creating a documentation of Dalit, Adivasi, and Bahujan history and culture. Sanghapali Aruna and Thenmozhi Soundararajan came up with idea during discussions at Color of Violence conference in Chicago.

Significance
Dalits are discriminated against because of their caste, despite such discrimination being illegal in India. Ignorance and absence of Dalits in Indian history by mainstream authors is discussed during Dalit History Month. Issues faced by Dalits are pondered upon by citizens.

In 2022, Canada's British Columbia province has recognised April as Dalit History Month.

Gallery

See also 
 Caste system in India
 Untouchability
 Caste-related violence in India
 Rashtriya Dalit Prerna Sthal and Green Garden
 April 2018 caste protests in India
 Battle of Koregaon

References

External links 
Dalit History Month website
DALIT HISTORY MONTH at Project Mukti 

B. R. Ambedkar
Dalit culture
Dalit politics
Dalit history
Dalit literature
April observances
Commemorative months
2015 introductions
Observances in India
Month-long observances in Canada
South Asian Canadian culture
Observances in the United States
South Asian American culture
Observances in the United Kingdom